Robert Duncan Milne (7 June 1844–15 December 1899) was a late-19th century San Francisco science fiction writer whose work was published primarily in newspapers of the time, and the magazine The Argonaut. Milne was rediscovered by Sam Moskowitz, who helped collect his work in Into the Sun & Other Stories.He was born in Cupar in Scotland.

Bibliography

References

External links
Article about Robert Duncan Milne's Science Fiction stories

Robert Duncan Milne fan blog: http://theeidoloscope.blogspot.co.uk/

American science fiction writers
1844 births
1899 deaths
Writers from the San Francisco Bay Area
Scottish science fiction writers
American male short story writers
American male novelists
19th-century American novelists
19th-century American short story writers
19th-century American male writers